Mykola Stepanovych Ryabovil (Ukrainian: Мико́ла Степа́нович Рябові́л ; Russian: Никола́й Степа́нович Рябово́л (romanized: Nikolai Stepanovich Ryabovol) ; 17 December 1883, in the village of Dinsk, the Kuban Region of the Russian Empire - 13 June 1919, at Rostov-on-Don) was a Ukrainian political figure in the Kuban. During the Russian Civil War he was the chairman of the Kuban Legislative Council and the chairman of the Kuban Military Council.

Early years 
Ryabovil's Family is originally from the village of Dinska in the Kuban. Mykola Ryabovola's grandfather was the foreman of the town for a long time, and his father worked as a town clerk for more than 35 years.  

After graduating from the one-class school, Mykola entered the Katerynodar military school. At the end of the year, he taught in his native village. He organized the first folk performances in it. 

Already in those years, Mykola came under the influence of the prominent public and political figure Stepan Erastov, the initiator of the creation of Ukrainian public, cooperative, educational and economic societies in the Kuban and the Ukrainian poet Mykola Voronoi, who moved to the Kuban, which made Mykola became a conscious Ukrainian. From 1902, he got close to Poltava seminarians Simon Petliura, Prokop Poniatenko and others, who launched a wide anti-government work in the Kuban.

Public career 
In  1905-1907 he, studied at the  Kyiv Polytechnic Institute, but due to participation in student performances, he stopped studying in the third year. This did not prevent him from making a quick career.  

Since his father founded a credit cooperative in 1907, Mykola had to help him. 

In 1909, the young Ryabovola was elected to the organizing committee for the construction of the  Kuban-Black Sea Railway. In 1912, the railroad charter was approved, and Ryabovil was elected one of its directors.  

In the autumn of 1912, together with another railway director, Colonel Orekhov, he visited London  to organize a bond loan. According to the canons of English business, they were charged a commission of 160,000 rubles for their work — a huge amount at that time. Both refused the fee and gave the money to the railroad.  

In 1912, he organized the Kuban Union of Small Credit Institutions, which soon became a powerful organization;  was elected chairman of the Union Council. At the same time, he headed the Kuban Cooperative Union.

Head of the Kuban Rada 

 Read more:  Kuban People's Republic 

In 1915, he was mobilized into the Russian army and sent to study at a military engineering school, which he successfully graduated with the rank of  ensign. He continued his service in the sapper unit in Finland, where he experienced the February Revolution. He was also a popular figure in the army, he was elected to the "Council of Soldiers' and Officers' Deputies."  

After returning home, he took an active part in politics (in the Military Council) and public and political life (in the Regional Food Committee). He was elected the head of the Military Council  .  

The Military Council, led by Ryabovola, renamed itself the Kuban Regional Council, proclaimed Kuban a republic under the name "Kuban Region" in September 1917. The first Kuban constitution was also adopted at this session ("Temporary Provisions on the Highest Authorities in the Kuban Territory"). According to it, the Legislative Council became the highest legislative body, and the Kuban regional government and the military chieftain, who had presidential powers and the right to veto the adopted laws, became the executive power. Ryabovil was elected as the head of the Kuban Legislative Council.  

He pursued a policy of the unity of the Kuban lands, the complete independence of the Kuban in the close relations to Ukraine. He was a supporter of the idea of the unity of Ukraine and the union of Ukrainian lands, he became one of the most popular Cossack politicians in the Kuban during the period of national liberation struggles 1917-1921.   The idea of Kuban independence and the union of Kuban with Ukraine had two external opponents: the Bolsheviks, who stood for the world socialist revolution  and considered Kuban to be a part of the RSFSR, and the forces that advocated the restoration of the Russian Empire (in particular, the Volunteer Army led by General Anton Denikin). In addition, there was an internal struggle in the Kuban - the idea of the independence of the Cossack nation and the state self-determination of all Cossack lands, not marked by a persistent Ukrainian color, had a significant impact. Ryabovil actively supported the latter idea, when Ukrainian-Kuban ties were impossible, because it had general democratic features of development and unlike Denikin's pro-anarchic ideas.  

In the first periods of activity in the Council, Mykola Ryabovil had close relations with Kuban Ukrainophiles Kindrat Bardizh, Fedor Shcherbina, Luka Bych and Stepan Manzhula. 

In May 1918, he led a delegation of the Legislative Council to Kyiv for negotiations with Hetman Pavel Skoropadskyi  on the establishment of interstate relations and cooperation in the fight against the Bolsheviks. The delegation in Kyiv was received kindly. Some of the representatives of the Ukrainian government spoke about the autonomy of the Kuban as part of Ukraine, others saw it in a federation with Ukraine. The Kuban representatives insisted on a federal connection. 

With the liberation of the Kuban from the Bolsheviks, Denikin sought to establish his dictatorship there. Having failed to agree with the Council and the government on the changes he needed to the Kuban Constitution, he decided to become a dictator by convening the Extraordinary Kuban Council, at which he planned to get his protégé elected to the post of Council chairman. Therefore, Cossacks of Russian origin and  "volunteers"  campaigned against Ryabovola, whom Denikin considered a dangerous enemy of Russia.  

The council headed by Ryabovola defended the sovereign rights of its republic. On December 4, 1918, at an extraordinary session of the Regional Council, a new Constitution was adopted, which changed the name of the Kuban People's Republic to "Kuban Territory".

The murder of Lukin 
The struggle for the independence of the Kuban was not always conducted by legal methods. 

On October 1, 1919, the head of the Kuban Military District Court, Lukin, a veteran and supporter of the Volunteer Army was killed in Katerynodar. The murder took place a day after Lukin's return from Rostov, where he came with a report on the growth of the Ukrainian separatist movement in the Kuban and the arrival of a secret delegation from Petlyura in Katerynodar. Kuban investigative bodies did not find the perpetrators.

The murder of Mykola Ryabovil 
The head of the Kuban Rada Mykola Ryabovil was killed by a White Guard agent during the federalist conference in 1919. 

In June 1919, the head of the Kuban Legislative Council, Mykola Ryabovil, led the Kuban delegation to the conference in  Rostov-on-Don on the creation of the South Russian Union (Don, Kuban, Terek and Volunteer Army). 

On June 13, 1919, at the conference, Ryabovil spoke about the need to unify the state entities of Ukraine, Kuban, Don, Terek, Georgia on a democratic basis to fight against the Bolsheviks. He sharply criticized the ideology and politics of the Volunteer Army.  

On the same day (June 13, 1919), he was killed by agents of the Volunteer Army. 

General Viktor Leonidovych Pokrovsky describes this murder: Near the Palace Hotel, where Ryabovil lived, there was a car with the engine running.  Inside the hotel, under the room of M.S. Ryabovola, three figures in military uniforms were milling about in the semi-darkness, caps were pulled over their eyes and collars were raised.  When Mykola Ryabovil entered the hotel, a fatal shot rang out - three military men, having committed a criminal act, ran out into the street, jumped into a car with headlights off and disappeared.  The counter-intelligence agent Kovryzhkin from Captain Baranov's special assignment unit was put on the dock in the case of Ryabovola's murder, and the murderous officers disappeared and were not traced. The murder of Ryabovola had a great political resonance, various political organizations and parties protested, Kuban was engulfed in mourning, and Kuban Cossacks increased desertion from the Denikin army.  This was the beginning of the breakdown of this army and its subsequent defeat by the Bolsheviks.

Memory of Mykola Ryabovil 
Although the name Ryabovol was banned in the Kuban under Soviet rule, the Kuban Cossacks preserved a song about him in the people's memory: 

On the death of Mykola Ryabovola 

 (recorded by Dmytro Petrenko) 
 Cry, Kuban, native land. 
 Your poor son lies dead. 
 There are no words to say it all 
 Our dear, native mother. 
 For what fate punishes 
 How about you, our dear land? 
 Why is our enemy fierce? 
 Makes hell out of that paradise 
 What can not be lived? 
 Every day the executioner threatens to kill. 
 Why then, you are dear to our land, 
 Are you driving us to despair? 
 Isn't it you, sweet Kuban, 
 Did she deserve such grief? 
 Even at such a terrible hour 
 How was Ukraine defended? 
 Longing went through the valleys, 
 Tears are flowing in rivers 
 The land is always crying and sobbing, 
 That Mykola is gone. 
 Sleep, you, our dear Mykola, 
 We will never forget 
 What have you done for the people 
 That you died for freedom. 
 Above your coffin here 
 We swear by you: 
 Everyone loves their native land, 
 We will take an example from you 
 How to defend that will 
 For that will to live 
 How to get that will 
 How to die for that will. 
 Let the earth be a feather - 
 People will not forget you 
 They will remember you 
 In the Kuban, in every house. 
 Sleep, brother, dear friend, 
 The whole region is very sad, 
 He sheds thick tears 
 And it falls to the grave. 

In 1990, at the celebration of the 500th anniversary of the formation of Zaporizhzhya Sich, a delegation of Kuban Cossacks brought a portrait of Ryabovil with the inscription "Mykola Ryabovil is a national hero of Ukraine. " since 2017 there is a Mykola Ryabovola Street in Kyiv.

See also 

 Ryabovil surname

References 

Ukrainian politicians
1883 births
1919 deaths
Kuban Cossacks
Kuban Oblast
Ukrainian nationalists
Russian Civil War
Ukrainian State
Hetmans